Henrique Batista Duffles Teixeira Lott (November 16, 1894 – May 19, 1984) was a Brazilian military and political figure.

Career
A former military attache in the United States, Lott was promoted to General in 1944. After President Getúlio Vargas' final downfall in 1954, his successor Café Filho appointed Lott, known for his loyalty to the constitutional government, as Minister of War. After Filho's leave of absence for health reasons on November 9, 1955 (with less than three months of his term left), President of the Chamber of Deputies Carlos Luz assumed the Presidency, as President-elect Juscelino Kubitschek and Vice President-elect João Goulart were expected to be inaugurated next January. As the military itself were bitterly divided politically, there were fears that part of it, with support of President Café Filho, would attempt to prevent elected leaders from taking office. Lott played a key role in a so-called "Revolution of November 11", ousting Café Filho and Luz after just three days in power, and installing the next in line, Senate First Vice President Nereu Ramos until Kubitschek and Goulart were sworn in.

Lott continued to serve as Minister under Kubitschek administration. In the 1960 presidential election, by now a Marshal placed in reserve, he was the term-limited President's hand-picked choice, running under the Social Democratic and Labour line and was defeated by Jânio Quadros in a landslide. However his running mate, Vice President Goulart, was re-elected (at the time, Brazilian President and Vice President were elected separately).

After Quadros' surprising resignation just seven months in office, Marshal Lott sided with those supporting Goulart's right to the Presidency. After the 1964 military coup Lott retired from political life, displeased with his colleagues ousting a legal government.

Sources 

1894 births
1984 deaths
Marshals of Brazil
Candidates for President of Brazil
Social Democratic Party (Brazil, 1945–65) politicians
Brazilian people of English descent